Rhonda Varnes (born April 14, 1984 in Winnipeg, Manitoba) is a Canadian curler. She currently skips her own team out of Portage la Prairie.

Career
Varnes grew up in Manitoba, where she won the 2001 Manitoba Juvenile Provincial Championship. As a junior curler, she played in three provincial junior championships as a skip. Her first season on the World Curling Tour was 2005–06. That season, she was the youngest skip at the 2006 Manitoba Scotties Tournament of Hearts where she led her Stonewall Curling Club rink to a 3–4 record. After the season she joined the Linda Stewart rink for one season. The team made it to the 2007 Manitoba Scotties, finishing with a 4–3 record. After one more season as a skip in Manitoba, Varnes moved to Ottawa in 2008.

In 2015, Varnes and her team of Melissa Gannon, Erin Macaulay and Rebecca Wichers-Schreur qualified for their first Ontario Scotties Tournament of Hearts.

References

External links

 Team Website

Living people
1984 births
Curlers from Winnipeg
Curlers from Ottawa
Canadian women curlers